The Ortega family is a Spanish dynastic family that is the eighth wealthiest family in the world. The majority of the family's wealth comes from the clothing company Inditex and its flagship store Zara. As of July 2022, the family has an estimated net worth of $59.6 billion. The head of the family, billionaire Amancio Ortega, is the twenty third richest person in the world.

Family
 Amancio Ortega (born 1936), billionaire businessman, chairman of Inditex, and co-founder of Zara, sixth richest person in the world and formerly the richest
 Rosalía Mera (1944–2013), former billionaire businesswoman and entrepreneur, co-founder of Zara, ex-wife of Amancio Ortega, formerly world's richest self-made woman
 Sandra Ortega Mera (born 1968), daughter of Amancio Ortega and Rosalía Mera, billionaire businesswoman and Spain's richest woman Married with Pablo Gómez.
 Martiño Gómez Ortega.
 Antía Gómez Ortega
 Uxía Gómez Ortega
 Marcos Ortega Mera (born 1971), son of Amancio Ortega and Rosalía Mera, has cerebral palsy
 Flora Pérez Marcote (born 1952), current wife of Amancio Ortega (m. 2001)
 Marta Ortega Pérez (born 1984), daughter of Amancio (chair of Inditex) Ortega and Flora Pérez, billionaire, divorced by Sergio Álvarez Moya, remarried to Carlos Torretta Echeverría
 Amancio Álvarez Ortega
 Matilda Torretta Ortega

By net worth

References 

Spanish families
Spanish billionaires